opened in 1984 in Nago, Okinawa Prefecture, Japan. The collection covers natural history as well as cultural history. The collection includes the shell of a giant clam which weighs over two hundred kilograms.

See also
 Okinawa Prefectural Museum

References

External links
  Nago Museum

Museums in Okinawa Prefecture
Museums established in 1984
1984 establishments in Japan